Peng Xinchun (also known as Nang Yin) is the current First Lady of Shan State Special region 4 and wife of Sai Leun, the chairman of the National Democratic Alliance Army and the leader of the Shan State Special region 4. She has high-ranking position in the Peace and Solidarity Committee (PSC) of Shan State-East. Nang was a major contributor to peace talks between National Democratic Alliance Army and the government of Myanmar.

She was born in Kokang, the eldest daughter of Pheung Kya-shin, the chairman of the Kokang Special Region in Myanmar (Burma) and the leader of the Myanmar National Democratic Alliance Army (MNDAA).

References 

Living people
Burmese people of Chinese descent
Year of birth missing (living people)
21st-century Burmese women politicians
21st-century Burmese politicians